The 2017 Dutch National Track Championships were the Dutch national Championship for track cycling, organized by the KNWU. They took place in Alkmaar, the Netherlands on 20, 27, 28 and 29 December 2017

Medal summary

References

External links
Results of this championship

Dutch National track cycling championships
2017 in track cycling
Track cycling
Cycling in Alkmaar